Jenny Langlo (born 1 June 1993) is a Norwegian singer. She is known for winning the sixth season of Norwegian Idol. Her official debut single, "Building an Aeroplane" was released on video the following week. She competed in the Melodi Grand Prix 2015 with the song "Next to You".

Discography

Singles
2011: "Building an Aeroplane"
2012: "Million Dollar Signs"
2015: "Next to You"

References 

1993 births
Living people
Idols (TV series) winners
Idol (Norwegian TV series) participants
Melodi Grand Prix contestants